Dan Hicks,  (born 1972) is a British archaeologist and anthropologist. He is Professor of Contemporary Archaeology at the University of Oxford, Curator at the Pitt Rivers Museum, and a Fellow of St Cross College, Oxford. His research is focused on contemporary archaeology, material culture studies, historical archaeology, and the history of archaeology, anthropology, and museum collections.

Early life and education
Hicks was born in 1972 in Durham, England. He was educated at Bishop Vesey's Grammar School, Birmingham, where he was taught by R. F. Langley.  He studied archaeology and anthropology at St John's College, Oxford, gaining a first class honours Bachelor of Arts (BA) degree. He received his Doctor of Philosophy (PhD) degree in archaeology and anthropology from the University of Bristol.

Professional career
Hicks is Professor of Contemporary Archaeology at the University of Oxford and Curator at the Pitt Rivers Museum. He was previously Lecturer in Archaeology and Anthropology at St John's College, Oxford, Lecturer in Archaeology and Anthropology at the University of Bristol, and Research Fellow in Archaeology and Anthropology at Boston University. Hicks worked as a field archaeologist in the local authority and private sector in the 1990s. He has conducted fieldwork in the UK, the eastern Caribbean, and the eastern United States, and has published on archaeological and ethnographic collections from around the world.

Hicks has appeared on television and radio, including BBC Radio 4's In Our Time and Making History. In 2017-18 he was the Junior Proctor of the University of Oxford. Hicks has also served as a Non-Executive Director of Museum of London Archaeology, a Member of Council and Trustee of the Society of Antiquaries of London, a Trustee and Delegate of Oxford University Press, and a Trustee and Member of Council of the University of Oxford. In 2019, Hicks co-curated the major exhibition Lande: The Calais ‘Jungle’ and Beyond at the Pitt Rivers Museum, with Majid Adin, Shaista Aziz, Caroline Gregory, Sarah Mallet, Nour Munawar, Sue Patridge, Noah Salibo and Wshear Wali.

Hicks's 2020 book The Brutish Museums was named one of the New York Times Best Arts Books of 2020, and was described as "a startling act of conscience" by Ben Okri, as "masterful" by the LA Review of Books, and by The Guardian as "A beautifully written, carefully argued book". The book has also been criticised for being politically zealous and intellectually dishonest; Professor Nigel Biggar of the University of Oxford wrote that "Dan Hicks has manifestly failed".

Hicks has written comment and opinion pieces in a range of publications such as The Times, The Guardian, The Telegraph, and The Independent, often covering issues of UK heritage policy, African cultural restitution, and archaeology. He has campaigned online for the Labour Party and is a vocal critic of the Conservative Party, tweeting "Fuck the Tories." during the 2019 General Election.

In 2022 Hicks courted controversy with his contributions to decolonising the Wellcome Collection's "Medicine Man" exhibit. He was criticised for "cloudy vagueness" and historical inaccuracy in asserting that Jeremy Bentham was opposed to the abolition of slavery and involved in the invention of race science. He responded to this accusation by claiming that the provision of bodies for anatomical investigation was a key part of the development of 19th century race science.

Honours
On 24 January 2008, Hicks was elected a Fellow of the Society of Antiquaries of London (FSA). He is also a full Member of the Chartered Institute for Archaeologists (MCIfA). In 2017-18 Hicks was Visiting Professor at the Musée du quai Branly – Jacques Chirac. In 2017, Hicks was awarded the Rivers Memorial Medal by the Royal Anthropological Institute.

Books

 
 
  (edited with Lesley McFadyen).
  (edited with Alice Stevenson).
  (edited with Mary C. Beaudry).
 
  (edited with Laura McAtackney and Graham Fairclough).
  (edited with Mary C. Beaudry).

References

External links
 Dan Hicks' website
 Home page at School of Archaeology, Oxford University
 Home page at St Cross College, Oxford
 Dan Hicks' page at Academia.edu, with PDFs of published works
 Home page at Pitt Rivers Museum, Oxford University
 Dan Hicks page on Facebook
 Dan Hicks on Twitter

1972 births
Living people
People from Durham, England
People educated at Bishop Vesey's Grammar School
Alumni of the University of Bristol
Alumni of St John's College, Oxford
English archaeologists
English anthropologists
English curators
Fellows of St Cross College, Oxford
Fellows of the Society of Antiquaries of London
People associated with the Pitt Rivers Museum